The 2005 FIBA Europe Under-20 Championship Division B was the first edition of the Division B of the FIBA Europe Under-20 Championship, the second-tier level of European Under-20 basketball. The city of Varna, in Bulgaria, hosted the tournament. Bulgaria won their first title.

Bulgaria and Hungary were promoted to Division A.

Teams

Squads

Preliminary round
The twelve teams were allocated in two groups of six teams each.

Group A

Group B

Knockout stage

9th–12th playoffs

Championship

5th–8th playoffs

Final standings

Stats leaders

Points

Rebounds

Assists

References
FIBA Archive
FIBA Europe Archive

FIBA U20 European Championship Division B
2005–06 in European basketball
2005–06 in Bulgarian basketball
Sport in Varna, Bulgaria
International youth basketball competitions hosted by Bulgaria